Formica cinerea is a species of ant in the family Formicidae.

Distribution
This species is distributed through the majority of Europe, from Spain to western Siberia and from Scandinavia to the Balkans. Its also present in the Near East and in the eastern Palearctic realm. It is lacking in the UK.

Description
Body is dark gray or silvery, large and agile, with extra large eyes and dark reddish legs.

This species can be easily confused with Formica fusca, Formica fuscocinerea and Formica selysi. The distinction of these species is very difficult and it is only possible under the microscope.

Habitat
Underground nest are usually built in dry and sunny sand habitats with scarce vegetation. It is often found together with the ant Lasius psammophilus on sand-dunes. Also occurs in human-constructed open habitats such as river dams, on seaside beaches and occurs up to 1800–2500 m in the mountains.

Biology
This species predates mostly insects, arachnids and other invertebrates, and also feeds on honeydew. It is very aggressive and therefore it is hardly used by other ant species as the host species. As an adaptation to open habitats these ants have good vision and can run very fast. Colonies may either be monogyne or polygyne, the latter frequently develop into vast and very populous polydomous systems. The swarming takes place from June to August, with a winter rest from October to March.

Gallery

References

Bibliography
 Csősz S, Markó B, Gallé L 2011. The myrmecofauna (Hymenoptera: Formicidae) of Hungary: an updated checklist North-Western Journal of Zoology 7: 55—62.
 Czechowski W, Markó B 2005. Competition between Formica cinerea Mayr (Hymenoptera: Formicidae) and co-occurring ant species, with special reference to Formica rufa L.: direct and indirect interferences Polish Journal of Ecology 53: 467—487.
 Markó B, Czechowski W 2004. Lasius psammophilus Seifert and Formica cinerea Mayr (Hymenoptera: Formicidae) on sand dunes: conflicts and coexistence Annales Zoologici 54: 365—378.

External links

Hymenoptera of Europe
cinerea
Insects described in 1853